KHEI (107.5 FM) is a radio station broadcasting a classic hits format. Licensed to Kihei, Hawaii, United States. The station is currently owned by Visionary Related Entertainment, LLC.

History
KHEI signed on the air on April 30, 2009, with a Hawaiian contemporary/reggae format branded as "Island 107.5".

On April 1, 2016, KHEI changed their format from Hawaiian contemporary/reggae to classic hits, branded as "Buzz 107.5".

References

External links

Ohana Broadcast Company, LLC stations
Classic hits radio stations in the United States
HEI-FM